Dmitry Torlopov (born 12 August 1977) is a Kazakhstani sprint canoeist who has competed since the mid-1990s. At the 1996 Summer Olympics in Atlanta, he was eliminated in the repechages of the K-2 500 m event and the semifinals of the K-4 1000 m events. Twelve years later in Beijing, Torpolov was eliminated in the semifinals of both the K-1 500 m and the K-1 1000 m event.

References
 

1977 births
Canoeists at the 1996 Summer Olympics
Canoeists at the 2008 Summer Olympics
Kazakhstani male canoeists
Living people
Olympic canoeists of Kazakhstan
Asian Games medalists in canoeing
Canoeists at the 2002 Asian Games
Canoeists at the 2006 Asian Games
Canoeists at the 2010 Asian Games
Canoeists at the 1998 Asian Games
People from Turkistan Region

Asian Games gold medalists for Kazakhstan
Asian Games silver medalists for Kazakhstan
Medalists at the 1998 Asian Games
Medalists at the 2002 Asian Games
Medalists at the 2006 Asian Games
Medalists at the 2010 Asian Games
21st-century Kazakhstani people